The Hul'qumi'num Treaty Group was founded in 1993 to negotiate a treaty with the Province of British Columbia and Government of Canada. The organization is based in Duncan, British Columbia.
Hul'quminum Treaty Group is currently in Stage 5 of the treaty process.

Members
The group is made up of close to 6500 members from the following First Nations:
 Cowichan Tribes 
 Halalt First Nation 
 Lake Cowichan First Nation (now Ts'uubaa-asatx Nation)
 Lyackson First Nation 
Penelakut Tribe

Publications & Work 
In the process of treaty negotiations, a great deal of research has been carried out by the Hul'qumi'num Treaty Group. Though much of the research remains confidential subject to treaty negotiations, many of the products of these projects can be shared with all. These include projects, reports, annual reports, guides, and other publications.

References

External links
BC Treaty Commission - Hul'qumi'num Treaty Group page
Hul'qumi'num Treaty Group website (archived version)

First Nations organizations in British Columbia
Duncan, British Columbia